The Harenna Forest is a montane tropical evergreen forest in Ethiopia's Bale Mountains. The forest covers the southern slope of the mountains, extending from 1450 to 3200 meters elevation. The Bale Mountains are in Ethiopia's Oromia Region, and form the southwestern portion of the Ethiopian Highlands.

It is one of the few remaining natural forests in the country, and the largest. The Harenna Forest is known for its native plants, mammals, amphibians and birds, including many endemic species. The montane climate of the southern Bale Mountains sustains plant communities distinct from those of the adjacent lowlands, and from montane forests elsewhere in the Ethiopian Highlands.

Geography
The Harenna Forest extends across the southern slope of the Bale Mountains. The forest covers portions of Goba, Delo Menna, Harena Buluk, and Meda Welabu woredas (districts) of Bale Zone, and Adaba woreda of West Arsi Zone in Oromia Region. The highest portion of the mountains, known as the Sanetti Plateau, extends above 4000 meters elevation. The southern edge of the plateau drops in a steep escarpment, descending from 3800 to 2800 meters elevation. Below the escarpment the mountain slopes descend more gradually to the southern plains.

The forest is in the upper watershed of the Ganale River, and is drained by its tributaries the Welmel, Weyib, and Dumale rivers.

The forests cover an area of 3500 to 7000 km2, between 39º15' to 40º 15' E Longitude and 6º 0' and 6º 45' N Latitude. The southern portion of Bale Mountains National Park protects part of the forest, which also extends outside the park boundary.

Climate
The forest has a montane tropical climate. There is a rainy season from March to October, and a dry season from November to March. The slopes between 2300 and 3000 meters elevation are often covered in dense mist, particularly during the wet season.

Flora
Plant communities in the forest vary with elevation.

Submontane forests occur from 1450 to 1900 meters elevation. Rainfall is from 500 to 600 mm annually, with a distinct dry season. The predominant tree is the conifer Afrocarpus falcatus. Other canopy trees include Cassipourea malosana, Celtis africana, and Croton macrostachyus. Some trees are semi-deciduous, dropping leaves during the dry season. Wild coffee is a common shrub in the forest understory.

Lower montane forests grow between 1900 and 2300 meters elevation. Middle montane forests occur between 2300 and 2800 meters. Upper montane forests, which include forests dominated by Hagenia abyssinica and extensive stands of the bamboo Yushania alpina, grow from 2800 to 3250 meters elevation.

Subalpine heathland, dominated by the tree heath Erica arborea, extends from 3250 to 3500 meters elevation, and forms the transition between the forest and the high-elevation alpine moorlands of the Sanetti Plateau.

One endemic species is the tree Maytenus harenensis, which is also classified by the IUCN as vulnerable due to the threat of logging.

Fauna

The Harenna Forest was once habitat to packs of the endangered painted hunting dog, Lycaon pictus. However, the presence of this canid is now in question here due to the population pressures of expanding human presence. The subalpine heathlands and alpine moorlands of the Sanetti Plateau are home to the largest population of the rare and endangered Ethiopian wolf.

The Bale Mountains vervet (Chlorocebus djamdjamensis) is limited to the upper Harenna Forest and other nearby forests. Its diet consists mostly of Yushania alpina bamboo shoots. The Harenna shrew (Crocidura harenna) is endemic to the forest, and the Bale shrew (Crocidura bottegoides) is found only in the forest and the afroalpine grasslands of the Sanetti Plateau.

The Harenna Forest is home to Ethiopia's only population of Harvey's duiker (Cephalophus harveyi).

Conservation
Forest lands in Ethiopia, including the Harenna Forest, are government-owned. Bale Mountains National Park covers the central part of the forest. The portion of the forest outside the national park is managed by Oromia Forest and Wildlife Enterprise (OFWE), a branch of the Oromia Region government. OFWE organized forest management in the region into eight local units, and Harenna Forest has been managed by Bale Forest Enterprise since 2009. Forests are managed in partnership with local communities.

Historically the forest was thinly populated. Many people have migrated to and settled in Harenna Forest in recent decades. The greatest population growth was in the late 1990s and early 2000s, when the population of Harena Buluk and Delo Menna woredas doubled. Population growth then slowed in the 2010s. New residents cleared areas of forest for coffee cultivation, pasture, and subsistence farming, mostly in Harena Buluk woreda. Comparison of Landsat satellite images from 1986 and 2006 found a reduction in forest area, particularly in the high-elevation ericaceous belt, with most of the former forest area converted to grassland and pasture by regular burning. Agricultural land is concentrated at lower elevations, along the forest–savanna transition.

The Ethiopian government has designated several areas of the forest as national forest priority areas, including Mena-Angetu National Forest Priority Area, which wraps around Bale National Park on the southeast, south, and southwest, and Harena-Kokosa National Forest Priority Area, west of Bale National Park and north of Mena-Angetu.

See also

References

External links

Forests of Ethiopia
Bale Mountains
Ethiopian Highlands
Geography of Oromia Region
Afromontane forests